Eliott Crestan (born 22 February 1999) is a Belgian middle-distance runner specialising in the 800 metres. He won a bronze medal at the 2018 World U20 Championships.

International competitions

Personal bests
Outdoor
400 metres – 47.02 (Nivelles 2021)
800 metres – 1:44.24 (Brussels 2022)
1500 metres – 3:47.17 (Ninove 2018)
Indoor
400 metres – 47.97 (Louvain-la-Neuve 2022)
800 metres – 1:46.11 (Louvain-la-Neuve 2022) NR
1500 metres – 3:46.44 (Louvain-La-Neuve 2020)

References

External links
 
 
 

1999 births
Living people
Belgian male middle-distance runners
Olympic athletes of Belgium
Athletes (track and field) at the 2020 Summer Olympics